Nexus Studios is an animation, film and interactive studio based in London and LA. It was founded in 2000 by Charlotte Bavasso and Christopher O'Reilly.

Creating a range of both handcrafted and high-tech work, Nexus Studios has a team of production staff, animators, technical directors, coders, illustrators and designers. They have a roster of directing talent which is backed by a 180-seat studio.

Their work includes Academy Award nominated animation, Grammy nominated music videos, D&AD Black pencil and triple Cannes Grand Prix winning commercials and D&AD white pencil winning digital and immersive experiences.

Awards

References

External links
 

Film production companies of the United Kingdom
Film production companies of the United States
British animation studios
Virtual reality
Augmented reality
Advertising industry
Mass media companies established in 2000
Entertainment companies established in 2000
2000 establishments in the United Kingdom